Titanium perchlorate is a molecular compound of titanium and perchlorate groups with formula Ti(ClO4)4. Anhydrous titanium perchlorate decomposes explosively at 130 °C and melts at 85 °C with a slight decomposition. It can sublime in a vacuum as low as 70 °C, and can form vapour at up to 120°. Titanium perchlorate is quite volatile. It has density 2.35.  It decomposes to TiO2, ClO2 and dioxygen O2 Also TiO(ClO4)2 is formed during decomposition.

Ti(ClO4)4 → TiO2 + 4ClO2 + 3O2 ΔH=+6 kcal/mol.

Properties
The Ti(ClO4)4 molecule has the perchlorate groups bidentately bonded to the titanium atom via two oxygen atoms. So the molecule could also be called tetrakis(perchlorato-O,''O)titanium(IV)'''.

In the solid form it forms clear coloured monoclinic crystals, with unit cell parameters a=12.451 b=7.814 c=12.826 Å α=108.13. Unit cell volume is 1186 Å3 at -100 °C. There are four molecules per unit cell.

It reacts with petrolatum, nitromethane, acetonitrile, dimethylformamide, and over 25° with carbon tetrachloride.

Titanyl perchlorate also exists in solvates with water, dimethyl sulfoxide, dioxane, pyridine-N-oxide and quinoline-N-oxide.

Formation
Titanium perchlorate can be formed by reacting titanium tetrachloride with perchloric acid enriched in dichlorine heptoxide. Another way uses titanium tetrachloride with dichlorine hexoxide.  This forms a complex with Cl2O6 which when warmed to 55° in a vacuum, sublimes and can crystallise the pure anhydrous product from the vapour.

Related
In the salt dicaesium hexaperchloratotitanate, Cs2Ti(ClO4)6 the perchlorate groups are monodentate, connected by one oxygen to titanium.

Titanium perchlorate can also form complexes with other ligands bound to the titanium atom including binol, and gluconic acid.

A polymeric oxychlorperchlorato compound of titanium, Ti6O4Clx(ClO4)16−x, is made from excess TiCl4 and dichlorine hexoxide. This has a varying composition, and ranges from light to dark yellow.

References

Perchlorates
Titanium(IV) compounds